Harry Pidhirny (March 5, 1928 – December 20, 2010) was a Canadian professional ice hockey player. Pidhirny played two games in the National Hockey League with the Boston Bruins during the 1957–58 NHL season, and was a top scorer in the minors, and juniors. In addition to the Bruins, Pidhirny also played for the Springfield Indians, Syracuse Warriors, San Francisco Seals, Providence Reds, Baltimore Clippers, and Muskegon Mohawks. He died in 2010.

Career statistics

Regular season and playoffs

References

External links
 

1928 births
2010 deaths
Baltimore Clippers players
Boston Bruins players
Canadian ice hockey centres
Galt Rockets players
Muskegon Mohawks players
Ontario Hockey Association Senior A League (1890–1979) players
Philadelphia Rockets players
Providence Reds players
San Francisco Seals (ice hockey) players
Ice hockey people from Toronto
Springfield Indians players
Syracuse Warriors players
Toronto Young Rangers players